Evergreen Memorial Park may refer to:

Evergreen Cemetery (Los Angeles)
Evergreen Memorial Park (Riverside, California), an alternate name of the Evergreen Cemetery in Riverside, California
Evergreen Memorial Park & Mausoleum, the operational division of the Evergreen Cemetery in Riverside, California
Evergreen Memorial Park (Omaha, Nebraska)
Evergreen Memorial Park (Portsmouth, Virginia)

See also
Evergreen Cemetery (disambiguation)